Liam Francis Peadar Donnelly (born 7 March 1996) is a Northern Irish footballer who plays as a midfielder for Scottish Premiership club Kilmarnock. Donnelly, who can also play as a defender, has previously played for Dungannon Swifts, Fulham, Crawley Town, Hartlepool United and Motherwell. He has also represented Northern Ireland internationally.

Club career

Fulham
Donnelly signed for Fulham as a youngster from IFA Premiership club Dungannon Swifts. Donnelly captained Fulham to the 2014 FA Youth Cup final.

On 31 July 2015, Donnelly signed for Crawley Town on a one-month youth loan. The loan was then extended until January 2016, however he was recalled early by Fulham in October.

Hartlepool United
On 19 August 2016, Donnelly signed for Hartlepool United, following his release from Fulham.

Motherwell
On 7 June 2018, Motherwell announced the signing of Donnelly on an initial two-year contract from Hartlepool United for an undisclosed fee. He scored his first goal for the club in a 3–2 victory against Livingston on the final day of the season.

At the beginning of the 2019–20 season, Donnelly moved from defence into midfield, and went on to score four goals in three games in the Scottish League Cup group stages, against Queen of the South, Greenock Morton and Annan Athletic. Then in the league, he scored four goals in the opening four matches, with two against Celtic and penalties against Hamilton Academical and Hibernian. In October 2019, Donnelly was rewarded for his early season form as he signed an extension to his contract at Fir Park, to run until summer 2022.

In the opening game of the 2020–21 season, Donnelly missed a penalty as Motherwell lost 1–0 away to Ross County. Following that match he picked up a knee injury in training which was initially expected to keep him out for two months, however he then required surgery on the injury, ruling him out until after the new year.

Donnelly made his return from injury on 14 July 2021, as a substitute in a 1–0 win away to Queen's Park in a Scottish League Cup group stage match. He was released by Motherwell at the end of the 2021–22 season.

Kilmarnock
Donnelly signed a one-year contract with Kilmarnock on 5 July 2022.

International
Donnelly made his senior Northern Ireland debut on 4 June 2014 against Chile, coming on as a substitute in the 89th minute.

On 11 September 2018, Donnelly made his 22nd appearance for Northern Ireland's under-21s in a 2–1 win away to Spain, a match in which he scored from a penalty, and in doing so became the nation's record cap holder at that level. He eventually finished his time with the under-21 side with 24 caps.

Donnelly was recalled to the senior squad in August 2019, ahead of a friendly against Luxembourg and a Euro 2020 qualifier against Germany. He came on as a substitute against Luxembourg on 5 September, earning his second cap, five years after his first.

Career statistics

References

External links

 Northern Ireland official profile at Irish FA

1996 births
Living people
People from Dungannon
Dungannon Swifts F.C. players
Fulham F.C. players
Crawley Town F.C. players
Hartlepool United F.C. players
Association football defenders
Association footballers from Northern Ireland
Northern Ireland youth international footballers
Northern Ireland under-21 international footballers
Northern Ireland international footballers
English Football League players
National League (English football) players
Motherwell F.C. players
Scottish Professional Football League players
Sportspeople from County Tyrone
Kilmarnock F.C. players